The Kolkata Metro (Bengali: কলকাতা মেট্রো), was the first underground railway to be built in India, with the first operations commencing in October, 1984 and the full stretch that was initially planned being operational by February, 1995.

Line 2

As of 2018, extension of East side of Kolkata Metro Line 2 has been proposed upto Santragachi and to be sanctioned by Railway ministry, Government of India.

Line 3

Line 4 
From Noapara to Barasat via Airport

Line 5 
From Baranagar to Barrackpore

Line 6 
From New Garia to Airport via Rajarhat New Town.

See also
Kolkata Metro

References

External link
 Official website

 
Proposed Kolkata metro stations
Proposed Kolkata metro stations
Kolkata Metro
Proposed railway stations in India
Kolkata metro stations